Unionism in Wales is the political view that supports a political union between Wales and the other countries of the United Kingdom (England, Scotland and Northern Ireland). As well as the current state of the UK, unionism may also include support for Federalism in the United Kingdom and a United Kingdom Confederation.

History

English rule in Wales 

Edward I of England invaded Wales in 1276-77 following disputes with Welsh sovereign Llywelyn ap Gruffudd (Llywelyn the Last, Prince of Wales). Following the killing of Llywelyn the Last in Cilmeri in 1282, Edward sought to end Welsh independence and introduced the royal ordinance of the Statute of Rhuddlan in 1284. The statute was a constitutional change causing Wales to lose its de facto independence and formed the Principality of Wales within the "Realm of England". The name refers to Rhuddlan Castle in Denbighshire, where it was first promulgated on 19 March 1284. The statute confirmed the annexation of Wales and introduced English common law to Wales for criminal cases, while civil cases were still dealt with under the Welsh laws of Hywel Dda.

Since conquest, there have been Welsh rebellions against English rule. The last, and the most significant revolt was the Glyndŵr Rising of 1400–1415, which briefly restored independence. Owain Glyndŵr held the first Welsh parliament (Senedd) in Machynlleth in 1404 where he was proclaimed Prince of Wales and a second parliament in 1405 in Harlech. Following the eventual defeat of the Glyndŵr rebellion and a brief period of independence, it wasn't until 1999 that a Welsh legislative body was re-established as the National Assembly of Wales which was renamed Senedd Cymru/Welsh Parliament in 2020. The banner of Owain Glyndŵr is still used as a symbol of independence today.

In 1470 Edward IV formed the Council of Wales and the Marches. Following the defeat of Richard III in battle, the Welsh King of England Henry VII continued the use of Council and it was mostly used for judicial purposes.

Henry VIII of England introduced the Laws in Wales Acts 1535-1542 via the English parliament, legally integrating Wales and England. This abolished the Welsh legal system brought about by Hywel Dda, and caused the Welsh language to lose any official role or status. The laws also defined the England-Wales border for the first time, and members representing constituencies in Wales could be elected to the English Parliament. The Marcher Lordships and Principality of Wales were united, essentially ending both.

In 1660, the council of Wales and the Marches was reconstituted but did not carry the same importance as under Henry VII for example. It was abolished in 1689 following the deposition of James II by the Dutch William III of Orange.

Around a century later and according to Blackstone's commentaries, the Wales and Berwick Act 1746 was passed, declaring that "where England only is mentioned in any act of parliament, the same notwithstanding hath and shall be deemed to comprehend the dominion of Wales and town of Berwick upon Tweed", meaning England would henceforth be used as a term to describe England, Wales and the town of Berwick.

Senedd 
In the early 1990s, Labour became committed to devolution to both Scotland and Wales, and in 1997 it was elected with a mandate to hold referendums on a Scottish Parliament and a Welsh Assembly. The proposed assembly won a narrow majority in the 1997 referendum. The political climate was very different from that of 1979, with a new generation of Welsh MPs in Westminster and a broad consensus on the previously divisive issue of the Welsh language. In 1997, a second referendum, following the 1979 referendum, on devolution, saw the Welsh electorate vote narrowly in favour of establishing a National Assembly for Wales by 50.3 per cent, on a 50.2 per cent turnout. In 2011 a referendum was held to determine whether Wales should be devolved further powers. The Welsh electorate voted in favour of further powers by 63.5% to 36.5%.

Arguments for unionism 
Reasons for continuing the union can be summarised as follows:

 Currency – In the event of independence for either Scotland or Wales, the issue over currency is brought up. A currency union between an independent Scotland and the remaining UK was ruled out in the lead-up to the 2014 referendum. Scotland can continue to use the pound sterling without a currency union, however will lack control over its monetary policy, such as interest rates as those would be the responsibility of the Bank of England, the UK's central bank, who may prioritise the UK's economy over Scotland, in the absence of a currency sharing agreement.
 Business - Some sources suggest some business uncertainty and potential restructuring of businesses so that headquarters are relocated in the country where the greatest amount of business occurs.

 Financial Losess - The Welsh Government is entitled to roughly £14 Billion per year from the Barnett Formula, but billions more in other sectors have been granted UK Government's Barnett Formula. Including Media,Special Education, Hospitality, etc.  Many Unionists agree that if Wales were to lose this funding. It would see harsh affects on the economy and services. - Sources: Welsh Government, UK Government, (Note: Cardiff University in a study in 2018 found that the current financial support is needed for the Welsh NHS to keep up with demand, as it's set rise for over 5 years.)

Polling in Wales

In 2007, almost 70% of people in Wales supported remaining part of the UK whilst 20% were in favour of Welsh independence. Since 2013, support for remaining in the UK has been between 49% and 74% of the population. In 2017, a survey by YouGov found that 22% of people polled favoured independence. In June 2022, 25% supported independence whilst 50% were opposed to independence.

Political parties in favour of unionism

Parties with parliamentary representation in Wales 

 Welsh Labour
 Welsh Conservatives
 Welsh Liberal Democrats
 Co-operative Party

Other parties 

 Liberal Party
 UK Independence Party
 Reform UK
 British National Party
 Abolish the Welsh Assembly Party
 Social Democratic Party
 Socialist Party Wales
 Christian Party

Political parties in favour of independence

Parties with parliamentary representation in Wales 

 Plaid Cymru

Other parties 

 Wales Green Party (in the event a referendum is held on Welsh independence. The party does not actively campaign for independence but has stated it would do so if a referendum was called on the matter)
 Propel
 Gwlad

See also

 List of movements in Wales

Unionism in the United Kingdom:
Scotland
Ireland
England

References

Unionism in the United Kingdom
Political history of Wales